Subash is a 1996 Tamil-language action film directed by R.V. Udayakumar and produced by K.S. Srinivasan and K.S. Sivaraman. The film stars Arjun and Revathi. The film's musical score is written by Vidyasagar. Subash was the last film featuring Silk Smitha.

Plot
Subash (Arjun) is portrayed as a troublemaker. His brother, Rajasekhar (Siddique) is a government minister. Their father, (Jaishankar), is a judge who was previously involved in a scandal. Subash falls in love with Savitri (Revathi), a middle-class Brahmin girl. Although Savitri loves Subash, she wants to marry someone successful and ambitious. Subash subsequently joins the Army and becomes a military officer. Upon his return from a military camp, his family share the news that Savitri and her father have died in a mysterious accident. Arumugasamy (Prakash Raj), an honest politician, a member of Rajasekhar's opposition party, as well as Subash's best friend, are also believed to have died. Subash suspects Thangamani (Manivannan), Arumugasamy's right hand, as the killer. Subash finds Savitri in Thangamani's house and rescues her.

Savitri reveals that Rajasekhar is a corrupt politician involved with terrorist groups. Rajasekhar's henchmen kill Arumugasamy, and Thangamani hold Savitri captive. Heartbroken, Subash resolves to punish his brother and save his country from terrorists. Later, Savithri has an accident and loses her memory. Subash marries Savitri in front of his family. He follows his brother and learns of his plans to kill all the religious leaders of India in the peace yatra. Subash and his father try to expose Rajasekar's plans, but Rajasekar's partner uses his influence to get orders for Subash to return to the army base immediately. To obtain additional leave for Subash, his father commits suicide. Subash's leave is extended to attend the funeral, allowing Subash to stop his brother's plan. Subash kills Rajasekar and his associates. Finally, Subash resigns from his commission, having attained the rank of Colonel.

Cast

Arjun as Colonel Subash
Revathi as Savithri
Monica Bedi as Anitha
Siddique as Rajasekhar
Prakash Raj as Arumugasamy
Mounika as Arumugasamy's wife
Jaishankar as Subash's father
Manivannan as Thangamani
Vadivelu as Subash's friend
Vivek as Subash's friend
R. N. K. Prasad as Indian Army General
Sudha as Lakshmi
K. R. Vatsala as Nithyananda Swamy's assistant
Y. Vijaya as Anitha's mother
Hemanth as Nithyananda Swamy
Sukran as Subash's friend
Silk Smitha in a special appearance for the song "Hey Saloma Salo"

Production
During the making of the film, composer Karthik Raja was replaced by Vidyasagar. This film was actress Silk Smitha's last film; she died three days after the release.

Soundtrack
The film score and the soundtrack were composed by Vidyasagar. The soundtrack, released in 1996, features 6 tracks.

References

External links
 

1996 films
Films shot in Ooty
1990s Tamil-language films
Films scored by Vidyasagar
Indian Army in films
Films shot in Kollam
Films about military personnel
Fictional Indian Army personnel
Films directed by R. V. Udayakumar